"How to Rob" is a song by American hip hop recording artist 50 Cent, released as his commercial debut single by Columbia Records. The song serves as the lead single from his intended debut studio album Power of the Dollar, which was ultimately shelved by the label due to controversies surrounding 50 Cent. The song, which features vocals from The Madd Rapper, was produced by the Trackmasters. The song was also included on the soundtrack to the film In Too Deep. The song was later included on 50 Cent’s 2017 greatest hits album, Best Of.

Background
The song features statements in quick succession about robbing and mugging numerous prominent figures in the urban music scene. After giving "R.I.P." shout-outs to Notorious B.I.G. and Tupac Shakur, 50 Cent talks about robbing, in order:

Kim Porter
P Diddy
Bobby Brown and Whitney Houston
Brian McKnight
Keith Sweat
Cardan
Harlem World
Mase
Ol' Dirty Bastard
Foxy Brown and Kurupt
Jay-Z
Case
Trackmasters
Slick Rick
Stevie J
Big Pun
Master P
Silkk The Shocker
Will Smith and Jada Pinkett Smith
Timbaland and Missy Elliott
Joe
Jermaine Dupri and Da Brat
DMX
Treach
DJ Clue
TQ
Raekwon, Ghostface Killah and RZA
Sticky Fingaz
Fredro Starr
Canibus
Heavy D
Juvenile
Blackstreet
R. Kelly (though not by name, is referenced within the lyrics)
Boyz II Men and Michael Bivins
Mike Tyson and Robin Givens
Mister Cee
Busta Rhymes and the Flipmode Squad
Kirk Franklin.

The song originally also had lyrics against pop and R&B singer Mariah Carey and her ex-husband Tommy Mottola with the lyrics "I'll man handle Mariah like 'Bitch, get on the ground' / You ain't with Tommy no more, who gon' protect you now?".  When the song was released, this line was replaced (because Mariah Carey threatened to leave the label if her name remained on the song) with the lyrics "I'll man handle Case like 'Duke, get on the ground' / You ain't with Mary no more, where you gettin' chips from now?", referencing R&B singer Case Woodard and his former girlfriend Mary J. Blige.

The song may have been a tribute to the infamous 1980s gangster Kelvin Martin, whose nickname "50 Cent" inspired 50 Cent's own name. Martin was infamous for robbing celebrities.

Emphasizing the humorous nature of the song, the song's own producers, the Trackmasters, are listed among the intended victims. Sticky Fingaz, who is also mentioned, had collaborated with 50 Cent the year before, as part of the group Onyx, on the song "React" from their 1998 album Shut 'Em Down. Sticky Fingaz also appeared in In Too Deep, which featured "How to Rob" in its soundtrack, as did another celebrity mentioned, Jermaine Dupri.

Of the other celebrities mentioned in "How to Rob", 50 Cent has worked with Jay-Z, Diddy, Mase, Busta Rhymes, DMX, Missy Elliott, DJ Clue, Juvenile, Joe, Lil' Kim, R. Kelly and Timbaland since the song's release.

Reception
Roxanne Blandford from AllMusic called "How to Rob" an "uproariously cunning single". Keith Farley of AllMusic also highlighted the song in his review of the In Too Deep soundtrack.

The single created a lot of buzz for 50 Cent's Power of the Dollar album, though it was eventually shelved by Columbia Records.

Response from artists
50 Cent said that he intended the single to be a joke, and not meant to disrespect anybody. Nevertheless, a number of rappers mentioned on the song responded on record. The comments made towards the Wu-Tang Clan were responded to on the Ghostface Killah album Supreme Clientele on a track called "Ghost Deini" and even more directly on a skit called "Clyde Smith" which included one of the Wu-Tang Clan members talking about how they intended to harm the rapper, which is identifiable as Raekwon when the track is sped up. A supposed diss song, "Who the Fuck Is 50 Cent", which circulated the web in the beginning of 2001 was rumored to be by the Clan, but was proven to be recorded by Polite of American Cream Team (Raekwon's then-side project). Jay-Z also reacted to the comments in the track called It's Hot (Some Like It Hot), off the album Vol. 3: Life and Times of S. Carter:

In an interview, however, 50 Cent claims that Jay-Z told him he loved the song, and that Jay asked permission to respond before he did.

Sticky Fingaz responded to the diss with the track "Jackin' for Beats."

Big Pun responds to this track in the song "My Turn" from his 2000 album Yeeeah Baby, which was released posthumously. In the song, he states:

Kurupt also responded to the track with "Callin Out Names":

Missy Elliott however responded in a humorous way, in the liner notes for her 2002 album Under Construction, on which 50 Cent appears:

Wyclef Jean referred to the song on "Low Income" from his 2000 album, The Ecleftic:

Legacy 
West coast rapper Jay Rock, remade the song in 2009 entitled "How to Rob '09". Maryland-based rapper Bandhunta Izzy, recorded a song titled “How to Rob” in 2019, which features vocals from The Madd Rapper, who had appeared on 50 Cent’s original version of the song.

Chart positions

References

1999 debut singles
50 Cent songs
Songs written by 50 Cent
Song recordings produced by Trackmasters
1999 songs
Columbia Records singles
Diss tracks
Gangsta rap songs
Songs written by Samuel Barnes (songwriter)
Songs written by Jean-Claude Olivier